David Stevenson may refer to:
Dave Stevenson (born 1941), Scottish pole vaulter (1964 Olympic Games)
David Barker Stevenson (1801–1859), Canadian businessman and politician
David J. Stevenson (born 1948), professor in planetary science at Caltech
David Stevenson (admiral) (1918–1998), Australian admiral; Chief of Staff, 1973–1976
David Stevenson (engineer) (1815–1886), Scottish lighthouse designer and engineer
David Alan Stevenson (1854–1938), his son, Scottish lighthouse designer and engineer
David Stevenson (footballer, born 1958), Scottish footballer (Dumbarton FC)
David Stevenson (Hibernian footballer) (fl. 1913–1928), Scottish footballer
David Stevenson (historian) (born 1954), professor in international history at the London School of Economics
David Stevenson (Scottish historian), emeritus professor of Scottish history at the University of St Andrews
David Stevenson (cyclist) (1882–?), British Olympic road racing cyclist
David Stevenson (cricketer) (1890–1974), Scottish cricketer
David Watson Stevenson (1842–1904), Scottish sculptor

See also
David Stephenson (disambiguation)